Colmar station may refer to:

 Colmar station (SEPTA), a SEPTA train station Colmar, Pennsylvania, USA
 Colmar station (Haut-Rhin), a railroad station in Colmar, France

See also
Colmar (disambiguation)